Biathlon at the 1990 Asian Winter Games took place in the city of Sapporo, Japan with three events contested — all of them men's events. The competition took place from 10 March to 13 March 1990 at the Makomanai Park. China finished first in medal table with two gold medals.

Medalists

Medal table

References
 Results of the Second Winter Asian Games

External links
 IBU official website

 
1990 Asian Winter Games events
1990
1990 in biathlon
Biathlon competitions in Japan